Paynter's Lane End is a hamlet in the parish of Illogan, Cornwall, England.

References

Hamlets in Cornwall